Adventures in Voice Acting is a 2008 documentary DVD produced by Bang Zoom! Entertainment, featuring interviews from actors and crew members on the craft of voice acting. It was initially released as a set of DVDs, and has since been adapted into workshops and classes around the U.S.

Summary
Adventures in Voice Acting contains interviews up to 100 voice actors, producers, and casting directors that are in anime dubs and video games. The DVD was released on July 3, 2008, after first of three volumes were released at Anime Expo. It took three years to complete, from concept to release, and was created by Bang Zoom to answer many questions they received from people wanted to know how to become a voice actor. Each episode is introduced by the animated character Mr. Mic, which was designed specifically for the documentary.

Featured voice actors
Voice actors interviewed in this DVD are:

Voice actors featured in sample clips, except:

 Todd Haberkorn as Kimihiro Watanuki in xxxHOLiC
 Keith Ferguson as Bloo in Foster's Home for Imaginary Friends
 Phil LaMarr as Wilt in Foster's Home for Imaginary Friends

Casting directors and producers
Producers and casting directors interviewed are:

 Sean Akins
 Jason DeMarco
 Jack Fletcher
 Norman J. Grossfeld
 Sean Molyneaux
 John O'Donnell
 Kaeko Sakamoto
 Kevin Seymour

Workshops
Since the release of the video documentary, Bang Zoom has provided multi-day workshops for prospective voice actors. They are taught by some of the industry veterans such as Tony Oliver, Crispin Freeman, Ruth Lambert, and Lex Lang, and some have been taught at various locales around the United States. Some of Bang Zoom's current voice actors / members have been participants in the program, including: Marianne Miller, Lauren Landa, and Cristina Vee.

References

External links
 Adventures in Voice Acting
 Adventures in Voice Acting - Volume One Review
 

Documentary films about the media
Direct-to-video documentary films
Voice acting
2000s English-language films